Fulcrum is a peaked nunatak rising to about  at the north end of the Lever Nunataks in the Wilkniss Mountains of Victoria Land, Antarctica. The position of the nunatak suggests a fulcrum upon which the Lever Nunataks act. It was named by the New Zealand Geographic Board in 1994.

References

Mountains of Victoria Land
Scott Coast